The commune of Buyenzi is a commune of Bujumbura Mairie Province in western Burundi.
The capital lies at Buyenzi.
Buyenzi commune has 25 horizontal streets. Each street has houses facing each other and a road in the middle. The majority of the population in Buyenzi are Muslim. It is home to the second largest mosque in Burundi; Masjid Jumuah situated on 12th and 13th streets.

References

Buyenzi